Puławy  (Pulavy) is a village in the administrative district of Gmina Rymanów, within Krosno County, Subcarpathian Voivodeship, in south-eastern Poland.

Pulawy is 310 km South of Warsaw, the country's capital city and has a population of 140.

References

Villages in Krosno County